Wang Hao-yu (born 29 October 1988) is a Taiwanese politician.

In the 2014 Taiwanese local elections, he ran for a seat on the Taoyuan City Council in District 7, which includes Zhongli District, as a candidate for the Green Party.  Out of 22 candidates, he was one of 10 elected, garnering 9.06% of the votes, the 2nd most amongst all candidates.  In 2018 he ran in the same district as a candidate, still under the Green Party, and was one of 11 elected out of 21, coming in 3rd with 8.68% of the vote.

He left the Green Party on January 11, 2020 and joined the Democratic Progressive Party on February 6, 2020.

Wang was the subject of controversy over a Facebook post in the wake of the suicide of Hsu Kun-yuan, the Kaohsiung City Council speaker and ally of Han Kuo-yu, following Han's successful recall.  About 200 Han supporters protested outside Wang's district office to call for his recall.

Wang was successfully recalled on January 16, 2021 with 92.23% in favor, 7.7% against, and a 28% turnout.  Thus, the number of votes in favor of his recall was 25.82% of eligible voters, exceeding the required 25%. The successful recall was the first for a city councillor in a special municipality. According to ROC law, Wang would be banned from running for the same post over the next four years.

References

External links
Wang Hao-yu's Facebook account

1988 births
Living people
Democratic Progressive Party (Taiwan) politicians
Taoyuan City Councilors
Politicians of the Republic of China on Taiwan from Hsinchu